Mandula Virag Meszaros (born 26 January 2005) is a Hungarian rhythmic gymnast, member of the national group.

Career 
Meszaros entered the rooster of the senior national group in 2021, debuting at the World Championships in Kitakyushu along Julia Farkas, Anita Fekete, Nadin Fodor, Reka Somhegyi and Monika Urban-Szabo where Hungary was 14th in the group All-Around and with 5 balls, 15th with 3 hoops and 4 clubs. 

In 2022 she competed at the World Cup in Pamplona, ending 7th in the All-Around and with 5 hoops and 6th with 3 ribbons and 2 balls. A week later the group competed in Portimão, taking 7th place in the All-Around and 6th in the two event finals. In June she competed at the 2022 European Championships in Tel Aviv, finishing 9th in teams, 8th in the All-Around, 11th in the 5 hoops final and 8th with 3 ribbons + 2 balls. In September Mandula took part in the World Championships in Sofia along Lilla Jurca, Alexa Amina Meszaros, Dora Szabados, Monika Urban-Szabo and Lujza Varga and the individuals Fanni Pigniczki and Hanna Panna Wiesner, taking 16th place in the All-Around, 16th with 5 hoops and 15th with 3 ribbons + 2 balls.

References 

2005 births
Living people
Hungarian rhythmic gymnasts
Gymnasts from Budapest